is a Shinto shrine in the city of Kagoshima in Kagoshima Prefecture in Japan.

History
The shrine was founded in Kyushu in 1882 during the Meiji period.

This class of shrine (Bekkaku Kanpeisha) was established in 1872 (Meiji 5) for the veneration of those kami who were, during life, ordinary subjects of the Emperor.  Only a very small number of shrines were designated as such.

See also
 List of National Treasures of Japan (crafts: swords)
 Terukuni Maru class ocean liner

Notes

References

 Holtom, Daniel Clarence. (1922). The Political Philosophy of Modern Shinto, a Study of the State of Religion of Japan. Tokyo: The Asiatic Society of Japan.  OCLC 503421997
 Ponsonby-Fane, Richard. (1964).  Visiting Famous Shrines in Japan. Kyoto: Ponsonby-Fane Memorial Society. 

Jingū
Religious organizations established in 1882
Shinto shrines in Kagoshima Prefecture
1882 establishments in Japan

Beppyo shrines